Celia Pavey, known professionally as  Vera Blue, is an Australian singer-songwriter signed with Island Records Australia, which is part of Universal Music Australia. Her folk-inspired album This Music peaked at number 14 on the Australian ARIA Charts in July 2013. Pavey sings, and plays the guitar and the violin. She placed third in season 2 of The Voice Australia. Her debut album Perennial achieved Gold certification in Australia after its release in 2017.

Career

2013–2014: Celia Pavey, The Voice and This Music

During the 2013 season of The Voice Australia, Pavey auditioned while playing the guitar and received acclaim from the judges and audience. Her first audition clip of Simon & Garfunkel's "Scarborough Fair / Canticle" has amassed over 14 million views online. She joined Team Delta and placed third in the competition.

Following The Voice, Pavey released her debut studio album This Music in July 2013, which peaked at number 14 in Australia. In 2013, Pavey was nominated for Cosmopolitan Magazine's Fun Fearless Female Awards.

Celia Pavey released her debut EP Bodies on 29 August 2014 which was produced by Eric J. Dubowsky. Pavey toured the east coast of Australia in support of the EP.

2015–2017: Vera Blue, Fingertips and Perennial

In August 2015, Pavey announced that she would be releasing music under the name Vera Blue.

Her EP entitled Fingertips was released on 13 May 2016. It features five tracks, including the two singles "Hold" and "Settle".

In 2016, she was featured on Australian rapper Illy's song "Papercuts", which peaked at number two on the ARIA singles chart.

Her single "Hold" peaked at number 5 on the US Spotify viral top 50 chart and number 1 on the Australian Viral 50 chart. In February 2017, Vera Blue released "Private". In June 2017, Vera Blue announced the release of her second studio album Perennial. The album was released in July and peaked at number 6 on the ARIA Charts. Her song "Regular Touch" placed at number 15 on triple j's 2017 Hottest 100.

2018–2021: "All the Pretty Girls" and "Like I Remember You"
On 26 October 2018, Vera Blue released the single "All The Pretty Girls" after premiering the song a day before on Australian radio station Triple J. She also released the live album Lady Powers Live at the Forum. 

In February 2019, Vera Blue released "Like I Remember You" in partnership with Greenpeace. Describing her involvement, Celia stated "I’m lending my voice to the campaign to stop oil drilling in the Great Australian Bight - for the love of our oceans... I feel a deep connection to our oceans and I know that the seafloor is no place for risky oil drilling".

2022–present: Mercurial

Vera Blue's second album (and Pavey's third overall), Mercurial, was released on 28 October 2022. It was preceded by the single "The Curse".

Touring 
Vera Blue supported Conrad Sewell on his Australian tour September 2015. In April and May 2016 Vera Blue supported Matt Corby on his Telluric tour. In July 2016 Vera Blue supported Broods on their Australian tour.

Vera Blue's own Australian headline Fingertips tour was completed in May 2016, with all 8 dates around the country sold out.
Vera Blue's second headline tour commenced in August through to October 2016, hitting metropolitan and regional cities.

Vera Blue supported Flume at the 2016 Splendour in the Grass Festival, performing his number one hit Never Be Like You.

The 'Private' Tour was announced on 16 February 2017 and toured Australia in support of her released single, "Private". After the rising popularity of March 2018 single "Lady Powers", Vera Blue set off on her biggest Australian tour, titled 'Lady Powers' in March and June 2018.

Discography

 This Music (2013) 
 Perennial (2017)
 Mercurial (2022)

Awards and nominations

AIR Awards
The Australian Independent Record Awards (commonly known informally as AIR Awards) is an annual awards night to recognise, promote and celebrate the success of Australia's Independent Music sector.

|-
|-
| AIR Awards of 2020
| "Rushing Back" 
| Best Independent Dance, Electronica or Club Single
| 
|-

APRA Awards
The APRA Awards are several award ceremonies run in Australia by the Australasian Performing Right Association (APRA) to recognise composing and song writing skills, sales and airplay performance by its members annually. 

! 
|-
| 2018 
| "Mended" (Andrew Macken, Thomas Macken, Samuel Telford, Celia Pavey, Adam Anders)
| Song of the Year
| 
| 
|-
| 2020 
| "Rushing Back" (Harley Streten, Celia Pavey, Sophie Cates, Eric Dubowsky) (with Flume)
| Song of the Year
| 
| 
|-
| rowspan="2"| 2021
| rowspan="2"| "Rushing Back" (Harley Streten, Celia Pavey, Eric Dubowsky, Sophie Cates) (with Flume)
| Most Performed Australian Work
| 
| rowspan="2"|
|-
| Most Performed Dance Work
| 
|-

ARIA Music Awards
The ARIA Music Awards are annual awards, which recognises excellence, innovation, and achievement across all genres of Australian music. 

|-
| rowspan="2"| 2020
| rowspan="2"| "Rushing Back" (with Flume)
| ARIA Award for Best Dance Release
| 
|-
| Song of the Year
| 
|-

J Award
The J Awards are an annual series of Australian music awards that were established by the Australian Broadcasting Corporation's youth-focused radio station Triple J. They commenced in 2005.

|-
| J Awards of 2017
| Perennial
| Australian Album of the Year
| 
|-

MTV Europe Music Awards
The MTV Europe Music Awards is an award presented by Viacom International Media Networks to honour artists and music in pop culture.

|-
| 2017
| herself 
| Best Australian Act
| 
|-

National Live Music Awards
The National Live Music Awards (NLMAs) are a broad recognition of Australia's diverse live industry, celebrating the success of the Australian live scene. The awards commenced in 2016.

|-
| rowspan="3" |  National Live Music Awards of 2017
| rowspan="3" | Vera Blue
| Live Voice of the Year
| 
|-
| Best New Act of the Year
| 
|-
| Best Live Voice of the Year - People's Choice
|

References

External links 

 
Instagram
Facebook
Twitter

1994 births
Living people
Australian women pop singers
21st-century Australian singers
21st-century Australian women singers